August Waibel (born 1894, date of death unknown) was a Swiss sprinter. He competed in the men's 100 metres at the 1920 Summer Olympics.

References

1894 births
Year of death missing
Athletes (track and field) at the 1920 Summer Olympics
Swiss male sprinters
Olympic athletes of Switzerland
Place of birth missing